Nickname the Czech Samurai may refer to:

 Jan Soukup, a Czech karateka and a retired  kickboxer, the branch chief for International Karate Organization Kyokushinkaikan Kyokushinkaikan in Czech Republic, the president of the Czech Kyokushin Karate Association and the vice president of the Czech Fullcontact Karate Organization.
 Jiří Procházka, a Czech professional mixed martial artist and former amateur Muay Thai kickboxer.

See also
 The Blue-Eyed Samurai